Agapanthia lais is a species of beetle in the family Cerambycidae. It was described by Reiche in 1858.

References

lais
Beetles described in 1858